Neorhynchia is a monotypic genus of brachiopods belonging to the family Frieleiidae. The only species is Neorhynchia strebeli.

The species is found in Pacific Ocean.

References

Rhynchonellida
Brachiopod genera
Monotypic brachiopod genera